Nocerina may refer to:
 A.S.G. Nocerina, was an Italian football club based in Nocera Inferiore, founded in 1910 and folded in 2015, also known as "Associazione Giovanile Nocerina 1910"
 A.S.D. Nocerina 1910, is an Italian football club that relocated from Campagna to Nocera Inferiore in 2015
 diminutive form of Nocera Inferiore